The PEN/Nora Magid Award for Magazine Editing given by the PEN America (formerly PEN American Center) is awarded biennially to "a magazine editor whose high literary standards and taste have, throughout his or her career, contributed significantly to the excellence of the publication he or she edits." It was established in 1993.

Candidates include "current editors-in-chief, literary editors, and 'back-of-the-book' editors of serious general interest magazines, book reviews, or literary reviews and quarterlies, whose intellectual discernment and wide range of interests recall the late PEN member Nora Magid, who was for many years the literary editor of The Reporter."

The award is one of many PEN awards sponsored by International PEN affiliates in over 145 PEN centres around the world. The PEN American Center awards have been characterized as being among the "major" American literary prizes.

Award winners

References

External links
PEN/Nora Magid Award

PEN America awards
Awards established in 1993
1993 establishments in the United States
Editor awards (print)
Literary awards for magazines